A book clasp is a leather or metal element attached to the medieval and early modern book covers, used to protect the book from the penetration of dust and light.

External links
 

Fasteners
Books
Locksmithing